William Coales (8 January 1886 – 19 January 1960) was an English long-distance runner who competed at the 1908 Summer Olympics. He won a gold medal in the 3 mile team, together with Joe Deakin and Arthur Robertson. On the same day he ran the five mile heats, but failed to finish.

References

External links
profile

1886 births
1960 deaths
English male long-distance runners
Olympic athletes of Great Britain
Athletes (track and field) at the 1908 Summer Olympics
Olympic gold medallists for Great Britain
English Olympic medallists
People from Aldwincle
Medalists at the 1908 Summer Olympics
Olympic gold medalists in athletics (track and field)